Hatchet House is an American independent subsidiary record label of Psychopathic Records based in Farmington Hills, Michigan. Created in 2007, the label specializes in hip hop music. Since its foundation, the label has featured 7 artists and bands from the United States, predominantly around Detroit, Michigan.

Catalog

All albums are released in association with Psychopathic Records.
Extra Pop Eporium was released in the "White Pop" version of Insane Clown Posse's album The Mighty Death Pop!.

The very first artist signed to Hatchet House was the rapper, Tali Demon in February 2007. Tali left the label only after 8 months due to creative differences.

References
General

 
 
 

Specific

External links
 Hatchet House’s official website
 

Psychopathic Records
Hip hop discographies
Discographies of American record labels